Francis Bonczak (Franciszek Bończak, December 1, 1881 - September 21, 1967) was a bishop of the Polish National Catholic Church. He was ordained to the priesthood on December 30, 1903, and consecrated on August 17, 1924. He organized Holy Name of Jesus Polish National Catholic Church in Milwaukee, Wisconsin and also served as an organizer of the PNCC in Poland.

References 
Obituary, Chicago Tribune, September 22, 1967, page 64.

External links 
Find a Grave

American bishops
American Polish National Catholics
Bishops of the Polish National Catholic Church
American people of Polish descent
1881 births
1967 deaths
20th-century American clergy